George Barnard Baker (January 29, 1834 – February 9, 1910) was a Quebec lawyer and political figure. He was a Liberal-Conservative member of the House of Commons of Canada representing Missisquoi from 1870 to 1874, from 1879 to 1887 and from 1891 to 1896 and in the Legislative Assembly of Quebec from 1875 to 1878. He was named to the Senate of Canada for Bedford division in 1896 and served until his death in 1910.

He was born in Dunham, Lower Canada in 1834, the son of William Baker, and studied at Bishop's College. He articled with James O'Halloran, was called to the bar in 1860 and entered practice at Sweetsburg with O'Halloran. In 1860, he married Jane Percival Cowan. Baker was elected to the House of Commons in an 1870 by-election after Brown Chamberlin resigned his seat. He served as minister without portfolio and then solicitor general in the Quebec cabinet. He was named a Queen's Counsel in 1876.

He died in Montreal in 1910.

His son George Harold was also a member of the House of Commons.

References
 
 

1834 births
1910 deaths
People from Montérégie
Anglophone Quebec people
Canadian senators from Quebec
Conservative Party of Canada (1867–1942) MPs
Conservative Party of Canada (1867–1942) senators
Members of the House of Commons of Canada from Quebec
Conservative Party of Quebec MNAs
Canadian King's Counsel